Fairy Park (also known as the Fairytale Park or the Fairytale Theme Park), is located at Anakie, one hour west from Melbourne and 30 minutes from Geelong in Victoria, Australia.

History 
Opening in December 1959, the park was the idea of Peter Mayer, a German immigrant to the country. The Mayer family would make many of the original displays by hand, before purchasing the land in Anakie and opening the park. The Mayer family still own and run the park to this day.

Fairy Park celebrated its 50th birthday in 2009.

Attractions 
 22 Hand Crafted Animated Scenes, including Cinderella, Jack and the Beanstalk, and Goldilocks
 Model Train display
 360° summit views from Elephant Rock at the top of Mt Anakie
 Camelot Playground

References

External links

1959 establishments in Australia
Amusement parks in Victoria (Australia)
Amusement parks opened in 1959